Yakov Agarunov (25 April 1907 – 31 May 1992) was a Mountain Jew poet, playwright, political and public figure of Azerbaijan, author of the new Mountain Jewish alphabet. He wrote in Judeo-Tat.

Biography
Agarunov was born into the family of a gardener. He studied at a traditional Jewish school from 1915 to 1919, and at the same time attended a Russian school.

In 1920 he became a komsomol activist and he participated in the work of an amateur drama club. From 1924 to 1925, he translated Uzeyir Hajibeyov's play "Arshin Mal Alan" from Azerbaijani into the Judeo-Tat language.

From 1925 to 1928, Agarunov studied at the rabfak in Moscow and Baku. He graduated from the history department of the Baku Pedagogical Institute and the Higher Party School under the Central Committee of the All-Union Communist Party of Bolsheviks.

In 1932 he started to work in the apparatus of the Central Committee of the Communist Party of Azerbaijan. From 1934 to 1938, Agarunov was the editor of the republican newspaper - "Communist" in the Judeo-Tat language; at the same time he worked as deputy director of the State Azerbaijan State Publishing House (he oversaw the publication of all books in Judeo-Tat).

In 1937 Agarunov was elected a candidate member of the Communist Party of Azerbaijan. From 1938 he worked as 1st secretary of the Ordzhonikidzevsky’s district party committee. Agarunov was awarded the Order of the Red Banner of Labour. 
In 1939 he became a member of the Communist Party of Azerbaijan.

In 1941 he worked as the secretary of the Baku City Committee for the Oil Industry. For exemplary fulfillment of the government's assignment, Agarunov was awarded the Order of the Badge of Honour.

In the fall of 1942, Agarunov was sent to develop virgin oil in the Kuibyshev region, and was appointed secretary of the Kuibyshev regional committee of the CPSU for the oil industry. For exemplary fulfillment of the task of the Party and government in wartime, Agarunov was awarded the Order of Lenin.

From 1947 to 1950, Agarunov worked as the secretary of the Baku City Party Committee.

From 1963 to 1971, Agarunov worked as deputy director of the All-Union Scientific Research Institute for Oil Industry Safety.

After retirement, Agarunov continued to engage in public and journalistic activities, and was a member of the Committee for the Revolutionary Glory of the Republic of Azerbaijan.

Agarunov stood at the origins of Judeo-Tat literature. Using the poetics of folklore, he tried to fill his works with actualities, in the spirit of official policy and public content.

He led a group of compilers of the Judeo-Tat alphabet based on Latin that was adopted at the Second All-Union Conference on Cultural Building among Mountain Jews (April 1929, Baku).

He compiled the Judeo-Tat - Russian and Russian - Judeo-Tat dictionaries in 8,000 words.

Agarunov wrote memoirs - "Oil and Victory" (Baku, 1991), - "The Big Fate of a Small People" (Moscow, 1995), - "How Judeo-Tat Literature Was Created". From 1974 to 1977, the almanac (Juhuri:Ватан Советиму) - "The Soviet Motherland" published excerpts of his works in the Judeo-Tat language.

Notable works
The poem (Juhuri:Ковтэр) - "Dove", 1920.
The satirical comedy (Juhuri:Падшох, рабби ва-ошир) - "King, Rabbi and the Rich Man"; 1920.
The play (Juhuri:Тахзир кини) -  "Whose fault?", another name is  - "Tears of Joy"; 1928.
The poem (Juhuri:Духдар доги) - "Mountain Girl", 1928.

Selected publications
Agarunov Ya. M. "The Big Fate of a Small People" About Mountain Jews: (Memoirs). Publishing house - Choro, 1995. 154 p. 2000 copies. – .
Agarunov Ya. M. "Heroic deeds of Azerbaijani oilmen during the Great Patriotic War." Baku: publishing house - "Azerneshr", 1982. 107 p. 4000 copies.|| "Oil and Victory": (About the heroic accomplishments of Azerbaijani oilmen during the World War II.) Baku: publishing house - "Azerneshr", 1991. 166 p. 5000 copies.
Agarunov Ya. M. "How the Judeo-Tat literature was created" // (Juhuri:Ватан Советиму) - "The Soviet Motherland". 1974–1977. (excerpts; in Judeo-Tat)
Agarunov Ya. M., Agarunov M. Ya. "Large dictionary of the language of Mountain Jews". Book I. Juhuri-Russian dictionary; Book II. Russian-Juhuri dictionary. Pyatigorsk: publishing house - PERO "Geula"; RIA-KMV, 2010. 660 p. 
 Agarunov Ya. M., Agarunov M. Ya. "Judeo-Tat-Russian dictionary". 9000 words. Jewish University in Moscow, 1997.  204 p.

Awards
Order of Lenin
Order of the Red Banner of Labour
Order of the Badge of Honour
Medal "For the Defence of the Caucasus"
Medal "For Valiant Labour in the Great Patriotic War 1941–1945"
Jubilee Medal "Thirty Years of Victory in the Great Patriotic War 1941–1945"
Jubilee Medal "In Commemoration of the 100th Anniversary of the Birth of Vladimir Ilyich Lenin"
Medal "Veteran of Labour"
Badge "50 years in the CPSU"
Personal pensioner of union significance

External links
Agarunov Yakov Mikhailovich - Soviet party leader, organizer of the oil industry, writer
Agarunov, Yakov - Shorter Jewish Encyclopedia
Russian writers of Israel. Yakov Agarunov
Judeo-Tat literature

References

1907 births
1992 deaths
Mountain Jews
Judeo-Tat poets
Judeo-Tat playwrights
Jewish writers
Soviet poets
Soviet writers
Soviet male writers
Soviet dramatists and playwrights
20th-century male writers
Burials in Baku
Communist Party of the Soviet Union members
Azerbaijan State Pedagogical University alumni
Azerbaijani poets
Azerbaijani dramatists and playwrights
Translators to Judeo-Tat
Soviet translators
Azerbaijani translators
Translators from Azerbaijani
Soviet editors
Azerbaijani editors
Recipients of the Order of Lenin
Recipients of the Order of the Red Banner of Labour